Aneta Lemiesz (born 17 January 1981 in Łódź) is a Polish runner who specializes in the 400 and 800 metres.

She currently works for the Polish Athletics Federation in addition to being an active masters athlete.

International competitions

Personal bests
400 metres - 52.68 (2001)
600 metres - 1:28.71 (2007)
800 metres - 1:59.93 (2006)

References

External links

1981 births
Living people
Polish female sprinters
Polish female middle-distance runners
Sportspeople from Łódź
20th-century Polish women
21st-century Polish women